Cosma may refer to:

People

Given name
 Cosma Orsini (died 1481), Italian Roman Catholic bishop and cardinal
 Cosma Shalizi (born 1974), American physicist, statistician, and academic
 Cosma Shiva Hagen (born 1981), German-American actress

Surname
 Adrian Cosma (1950–1996), Romanian handball player
 Alice Kandaleft Cosma (c. 1895–c. 1965), Syrian diplomat and women's rights activist
 Gheorghe Cosma (1892–1969), Romanian major-general during World War II
 Maria Cosma, Romanian sprint canoeist
 Vladimir Cosma (born 1940), Romanian-born French composer and musician

Other uses
 Cosma River, a river in Romania
 Cosma (Lithuania), a Lithuanian athletics sports club from the capital city Vilnius
 Cosma Foot, a French Guianese football team playing at the top level
 Cosma International, a subsidiary of automotive component manufacturer Magna International

See also
 Joseph Kosma (1905–1969), Hungarian-French composer
 KOSMA, a radio telescope in Switzerland 1985–2010; moved to Tibet and renamed CCOSMA
 COMSA (disambiguation)	
 Cosimo (disambiguation)	
 Cosmas (disambiguation)	
 Cosmo (disambiguation)